Angry German Kid, Keyboard Crasher, Unreal Tournament Kid, PC Spielen or Leopold Slikk are the names of a viral web video from 2005 showing German teenager Norman Kochanowski (born May 29, 1991) trying to play Unreal Tournament on his PC, but he faces problems with it, such as the game loading up slowly, which causes him to get enraged and shout, as well as smashing his keyboard in some scenes. Business Wire awarded Angry German Kid second place in the top 10 internet videos of the year in 2006, and in 2007, The Guardian ranked it as number three on its Viral Video Chart.

Creation and initial reception 
Ever since he received a camera for his 13th birthday, Kochanowski had been experimenting with it and releasing short films under a variety of aliases, the most popular being "Leopold Slikk". At first the videos were published in forums and video sites or exchanged on CDs. In 2005, he released a parody of rap music videos with the fictional character "real gangster". It quickly spread to many platforms, and its success led to sequels featuring the same character. In addition to "real gangster", he often calls himself "Slikk" online.

In 2005, he released "Real Gangster 5: Play PC", in which he acts as a gamer who throws a tantrum because the computer game Unreal Tournament does not load fast enough. He grows angry, yells at the computer and smashes his keyboard. Even after the game loads, he still loses, ultimately destroying the keyboard in a fit of rage.

After its first release in 2005, the video was soon shared on other sites, including YouTube. The video was edited by others, music was added, or other words in other languages were put into the protagonist's mouth. It soon established itself worldwide as an internet phenomenon and spawned a web series called "The Angry German Kid Show".

Misperception and effects on personal life 
However, many viewers were not aware that the scene was acted. After the Emsdetten school shooting in November 2006, a discussion broke out in Germany about the dangers of computer games, in which Focus TV distributed the video of the Angry German Kid as an example of how games could make young people aggressive. The video was distributed further, with text commentaries naming the protagonist Leopold and claiming it was a genuine recording secretly filmed by Leopold's father, and that he was now in a clinic because of his internet addiction. The television report was sharply criticized by the scene media, which pointed out that the protagonist of the video was known for staging it. Nevertheless, he became a symbol of the fear that video games could turn young people into violent criminals. Years later, Focus retracted the article and flagged it from publication.

Due to the increasing distribution, Kochanowski was bullied by classmates. He tried to clarify that the scene was not real, but then deleted all his videos from the internet as far as he could and withdrew. He claims that he eventually went crazy from the relentless bullying, which led to him intimidating classmates, and drunkingly announcing a potential killing spree at his school. This resulted in him being expelled and serving a month in prison.

Later life 
In 2015, Kochanowski began producing videos again on YouTube. They concern his fitness training and have no relation to his earlier videos. He was eventually recognized, but did not initially respond to inquiries about his previous videos or Angry German Kid. At the end of 2017, Kochanowski re-entered under the public sphere the new pseudonym Hercules Beatz. Kochanowski, who was 26 years old at the time and has trained for a bodybuilder's physique, published a diss track in which he talks about the events surrounding the publication of the web video 12 years earlier and insults those who bullied him. Since 2018, he has also published his own rap songs.

Today, the video is considered a prime example of web videos in the 2000s, and has been studied in the context of the psychology of computer users.

Documentations 
 Die unglaubliche Geschichte des Angry German Kid(Translation: The Incredible Story of the Angry German Kid), YouTube channel of funk, May 27, 2020, runtime: 9:50 min)
 Zapp (magazine): Ausgerastet und abgestürzt: Der Fall des Angry German Kid(Translation: Freaked out and crashed: The case of the Angry German Kid),  YouTube channel of NDR, February 01, 2023 (runtime: 23 min.)

References

External links 
 Entry at Know your Meme (English)
 Original Video (archive.org)

Internet memes
2005 films
Viral videos